Istiophoriformes are an order of bony fish which is not fully recognized by some taxonomists, with some including the two extant families Xiphiidae and Istiophoridae, and others including the family Sphyraenidae.

Families
The following families are classified under the Istiophoriformes. Three are extant, and three are extinct:

 Sphyraenidae (barracudas)
 Xiphiidae (swordfish)
 Istiophoridae (marlins, spearfish and sailfish)
 †Hemingwayidae
 †Palaeorhynchidae
 †Blochiidae

References

Ray-finned fish orders